Wei Huacun (252–334), courtesy name  Xianan (賢安), was a founder of the Shangqing sect of Daoism.

Overview
Wei was born in 252 in Jining, Shandong in the former county of Rencheng (任城). Her father, Wei Shu (魏舒), was a government official. From an early age she displayed a propensity for studying the works of Laozi and Zhuangzi, and practising Daoist methods of cultivation.

At the age of 24, she was married to Liu Wen (劉文) against her will by her parents and had two sons. After they grew up, she resumed her Daoist practices. At some point she became a libationer in the priesthood of the Celestial Masters sect of Daoism.

According to her Shangqing hagiographers, her devotion to Daoist cultivation so impressed a number of immortals that she received revelations from them 31 volumes of Daoist scriptures which would become the foundation of Shangqing Daoism. Among these was the Yellow Court Classic (黃庭經), which detailed a form of Daoist meditation involving the visualizations of deities within the adept's body, a practice that would become a defining feature of Shangqing. Shangqing has sometimes been described as a "mystical" form of Daoism, emphasising the notion of the human body as a microcosm containing universal energies, which could be actualised by ecstatic union with deities. With the emphasis on meditation, there would be much less attention paid to physiological cultivation by ingesting herbs and drugs, which had been important in earlier forms of Daoism.

When Wei's disciple Yang Xi (楊羲) formally founded the Shangqing school, 30 years after her death, Wei was acknowledged as the first Patriarch of Shangqing Daoism and, as an immortal, would be a source of continuing revelations. The sect would be centred on Mao Mountain (茅山), situated to the south of Nanjing, and would thus be also known as the Maoshan sect. From the 6th to the 10th century, Shangqing would be the most prominent Daoist sect and would gain favour among aristocrats of the Tang dynasty. The Shangqing scriptures were regarded as possessing a high literary quality that previous Daoist scriptures did not, and their vivid esoteric imagery was an inspiration to artists and poets.

References

Works cited
 Boutonnet, Olivier, "La figure divine de Wei Huacun 魏華存 dans le taoïsme Shangqing au VIIIe siècle : la place du culte et la question du genre dans la pratique spirituelle", T'oung Pao, volume 107 (2021): issue 5-6 (Dec 2021), p. 582-632.
 Qing, Xitai, "Wei Huacun". Encyclopedia of China (Religion Edition), 1st ed.
 Robinet, Isabelle. Taoism: Growth of a Religion. Trans. Phyllis Brooks. Stanford: Stanford University Press, 1997.
 Saso, Michael. The Gold Pavilion: Taoist Ways to Peace, Healing, and Long-life.North Clarendon: Charles E. Tuttle Company, Inc., 1995.

252 births
334 deaths
Cao Wei Taoists
Jin dynasty (266–420) Taoists
Taoist religious leaders
3rd-century Chinese women
4th-century Chinese women
4th-century Chinese people
Taoist immortals